Riding on the success of their previous two tours, Elton John and Billy Joel once again hit the stadiums in 1998. The production had previously only toured the United States and Canada, but this time they visited Australia, New Zealand, Japan, and Europe, avoiding any North American cities.

On 6 June, Joel pulled out of a concert at Wembley Stadium in London, England due to illness. John performed the show without him, playing several of Joel's songs. The same happened in Zurich, Switzerland at Letzigrund Stadium on 30 June; this was the last night of the 1998 tour.

Joel stated in 2012 that he would no longer tour with John because it restricts his setlists.

Tour dates

Setlists

References

External links

 Information Site with Tour Dates

1998 concert tours
Billy Joel concert tours
Co-headlining concert tours
Elton John concert tours